Julia Brown may refer to:

Julia Brown (actress), Scottish actress 
Julia Brown (organist), Brazilian classical organist
Julia Brown (prostitute), 19th-century madam and prostitute
Julia Brown Mateer (died 1898), American educator and Presbyterian missionary
Julia Brown (band), an American indie pop band

See also
Julie Brown (disambiguation)